Donal Carey (born 15 October 1937) is a former Irish Fine Gael politician who served as Minister of State for the Gaeltacht and the Islands from 1995 to 1997. He served as a Teachta Dála (TD) for the Clare constituency from 1982 to 2002. He also served as a Senator for the Labour Panel from 1981 to 1982.

Carey was educated at St Flannan's College, Ennis and University College Dublin. He was elected to the 15th Seanad in 1981 as a Senator for the Labour Panel. Carey was elected a Fine Gael TD for the Clare constituency at the February 1982 general election and retained his seat until losing it at the 2002 general election.

On 27 January 1995, he was appointed by the Rainbow Government on the nomination of John Bruton as Minister of State at the Department of the Taoiseach with responsibility for western development and rural renewal and Minister of State at the Department of Arts, Culture and the Gaeltacht with responsibility for the Gaeltacht, holding the posts until the change of government in 1997.

His son Joe Carey was elected in 2007 as a Fine Gael TD for the same constituency.

References

 

1937 births
Living people
Fine Gael TDs
Politicians from County Clare
Local councillors in County Clare
Members of the 15th Seanad
Members of the 23rd Dáil
Members of the 24th Dáil
Members of the 25th Dáil
Members of the 26th Dáil
Members of the 27th Dáil
Members of the 28th Dáil
Ministers of State of the 27th Dáil
Alumni of University College Dublin
Fine Gael senators